Conte is an Italian surname. Notable people with the surname include:

 Antoine Conte (born 1994), French-Guinean footballer
 Antonio Conte (born 1969), Italian football manager and former player
 Carmelo Conte (born 1938), Italian lawyer and politician
 Chris Conte (born 1989), American football player
 Claudia Conte (born 1999), Spanish heptathlete
 Gian Biagio Conte (born 1941), Italian classicist
 Giuseppe Conte (born 1964), Prime Minister of Italy 2018-2021
 Hugo Conte (born 1963), Argentine volleyball player
 Ignacio Conte (born 1969), Spanish footballer
 J-P Conte, also known as Jean-Pierre 'JP' Conte, American businessman and philanthropist
 Lamine Conte (born 1998), Guinean footballer
 Lansana Conté (1934–2008), former President of Guinea
 Maria Pia Conte (born 1944), Italian actress
 Maureen Conte,  American biogeochemist
 Mirko Conte (born 1974), Italian footballer
 Nicola Conte, Italian DJ and producer
 Nicolas-Jacques Conté, French painter, balloonist, army officer, and inventor of the modern pencil
 Paolo Conte (born 1937), Italian singer and composer
 Richard Conte (1910–1975), United States actor
 Richard Conte (artist) (born 1953), French contemporary artist
 Silvio O. Conte (1921–1991), United States congressman
 Steve Conte (born 1960), American songwriter and guitarist
 Tom Conte, American computer scientist
 Victor Conte, nutritionist at the center of the BALCO steroids scandal
 Paul Conte, kick-boxer at Martial Arts                      
 JR Conte, Italian computer scientist     
 Anthony (Tony) Conte (born 1956), Tubist and Bassist 

Italian-language surnames